Burley Hill is a hamlet in the Erewash district, in the county if Derbyshire, England. It is located one mile north of Allestree. Burley Hill was the location of a pottery in the 13th and 14th centuries and some of those pots are preserved in Derby Museum.

References

Hamlets in Derbyshire
Borough of Erewash